Oakland Lake is a 255-acre lake located in central Oakland County in both Waterford Township and Independence Township.

There are several basins in the lake, reaching 25 feet, 27 feet, and the deepest being 64 feet, with all three basins having relatively steep side slopes. There are a number of shallow bays on the lake that are less than five-feet deep and several small islands.

Originally called Pond Lake, Oakland Lake is located on the upper reaches of
the Clinton River watershed. The Clinton River enters Oakland Lake on the west end through a short, wide connection to Woodhull Lake immediately upstream.

The Clinton River exits on the southeast end where there are two dams that regulate water level. Both Oakland and Woodhull lakes have a legal established lake level elevation of 957.43. A short distance downstream of Oakland Lake, the Clinton River enters into Schoolhouse Lake and Loon Lake. Near the central portion of Oakland Lake and to the south, a short, shallow connection leads to Leggets Lake, which is a small (25 acres), shallow (10 feet) lake.

References

Lakes of Oakland County, Michigan
Lakes of Michigan
Lakes of Waterford Township, Michigan
Lakes of Independence Township, Michigan